Dysschema pictum is a moth of the family Erebidae first described by Félix Édouard Guérin-Méneville in 1844. It is found in Brazil.

The larvae feed on the leaves of Mikania hirsutissima, Senecio brasiliensis and Vernonia polyanthes.

References

Moths described in 1844
Dysschema